Shams Pir is an island village near Karachi, Pakistan, along the western end of Karachi Harbour, close to Sandspit Beach and Kakapir. It is administered as part of the Karachi West district. Approximately 5,000 people now live on the island. The village is bordered by thick Mangrove forests which grow in the harbor.

Shams Pir is named for a Mazar (shrine) of a saint named Hazrat Sham Pir which located on the island. Shams Pir is an old village which, like Bhit Shah Island and Baba Island, predates the formal establishment of Karachi. Residents from Baba and Bhit islands helped settle Shams Pir. During the British era, some residents of Mithadar and Kharadar were settled in Shams Pir during construction of the Port of Karachi. Some of those residents moved further west and established the fishing village of Kakapir.

References

See also
 List of islands of Pakistan

 
Neighbourhoods of Karachi
Islands of Karachi
Islands of Sindh